The Saint: Fear in Fun Park (also known as The Saint in Australia and Summertime in Sydney) is a 1989 TV film featuring Simon Dutton as Simon Templar, the crimefighter also known as The Saint.

It was one of a series of Saint films produced in Australia and broadcast as part of the syndicated series Mystery Wheel of Adventure.  It was set in Australia.

Plot
The Saint arrives in Sydney to look for a friend's daughter who is caught up in the Asian slave trade.

Cast
 Simon Dutton as Simon Templar
 Rebecca Gilling as Aileen
 Ed Devereaux as Harry
 Nikki Coghill as Felicity
 Richard Roxburgh as Justin
 Moya O'Sullivan as Madge

Production
This movie was one of six 100-minute TV films, all starring Simon Dutton made for London Weekend Television (LWT) in the United Kingdom, it was postponed due to poor ratings, but went out as part of The Mystery Wheel of Adventure in the United States:
 The Saint: The Brazilian Connection (2 September 1989)
 The Saint: The Blue Dulac (9 September 1989)
 The Saint: Wrong Number (21 July 1990)
 The Saint: The Big Bang (28 July 1990)
 The Saint: The Software Murders (4 August 1990)

Broadcast
The film was postponed for broadcasting on 16 September 1989 and on 7 July 1990, and finally broadcast on 14 July 1990.

References

External links

1989 films
1989 television films
Australian drama television films
Films set in Australia
Films shot in Sydney
Australian action films
Australian crime drama films
Films directed by Donald Crombie
1980s English-language films